The Meichu Game is an annual sports competition in March between National Tsing Hua University (NTHU) and National Yang Ming Chiao Tung University (Merger of National Yang Ming University and National Chiao Tung University) of Taiwan. Both schools are located in Hsinchu City, Taiwan. The competition was first held in 1969, although an unofficial tournament had been held in 1966.

 (plum-tree) stands for NTHU and 竹 (bamboo) for NYCU. The symbolic names are taken from the founders of both universities, Mei Yi-chi of NTHU and Ling Chu-ming of NCTU, and they further represent pride and purity (plum) as well as rich and everlasting heritage (bamboo). During the Tournament, undergraduate students from each school are competing with those who are from the other with such sports and games as soccer, tennis, chess, etc. The Tournament is held during a week and is accompanied by attractions like concerts, barbecue and parades.

In 2011, NCTU won in badminton, baseball, chess, women's basketball and men's and women's volleyball, whereas NTHU won in table tennis, tennis, men's basketball and bridge, so that NCTU were overall winners.

Previous Results

References

External links 
2022 Meichu Games (infos up to 2022)
來鴻：清華、交大“梅竹賽”, BBC News, 17 March, 2003

Multi-sport events in Taiwan
Competitions in Taiwan
Recurring sporting events established in 1969
Hsinchu
College sports rivalries
Spring (season) events in Taiwan